Saint Malo (also known as Maclou, Maloù or Mac'h Low, or in Latin as Maclovius or Machutus,  27 March 520 – 15 November 621) was a Welsh mid-sixth century founder of Saint-Malo, a commune in Brittany, France. He was one of the seven founding saints of Brittany.

Life
Malo's name may derive from the Old Breton machlou, a compound of mach "warrant, hostage" and lou (or loh) "brilliant, bright, beautiful". Details of Malo's career have been preserved in three medieval 'Lives' that seem to include incidents associated with multiple people bearing a similar name.

Malo was probably born in Llancarfan (Wales) in approximately 520. He was the son of Dervel, sister of Amwn Ddu, and therefore cousin to St. Samson. He was placed in the abbot's care at a tender age, and grew up at the abbey, where he was ordained priest and assigned the office of preacher.

Voyages with Brendan
As a monk at Llancarfan Abbey in Wales, Malo was known for his participation in the voyage of Saint Brendan the Navigator. Malo became Brendan's favourite disciple. According to the Voyage of Saint Brendan the Abbot, Brendan and Malo left Llancarfan Abbey with several companions and discovered the "Island of the Blest". He then went to sea on a second voyage and visited the Island of Cézembre, remaining there for some time.  During their travels, they encountered Maclovius, a dead giant whom Brendan temporarily revived with his holiness. Brendan baptised him before the giant returned to his grave. It is thought that Brendan, on the occasion of his second voyage, evangelised the Orkney Islands and the northern isles of Scotland.

Breton evangelist
At Aleth, Malo served under a venerable hermit named Aaron. Upon Aaron's death in 544, Malo continued the spiritual rule of the district subsequently known as Saint-Malo and was consecrated as the first Bishop of Aleth (now Saint Servan). Many miracles are related of him there.

In old age, the disorder on the island compelled Malo to leave, but the people soon begged him to return. He obliged his people and returned to restore order. Feeling at the end of his life, Malo was determined to spend his last days in solitary penance. He died at an advanced age during a voyage from Aleth to Archambiac (near Archingeay) in the province of Saintonge. Malo might have died on 15 November 621 (although this may be the death date of Saint Marcoult).

Veneration
The city of Saint-Malo is one of the seven stages in the Tro Breizh ("Tour of Brittany", in Breton), a pilgrimage celebrating the seven founding saints of Brittany.

Indirectly, the Spanish name of the Falkland Islands, Islas Malvinas, can be traced to Malo, as it is derived from the French, Îles Malouines and named by Louis Antoine de Bougainville in 1764 after the first known settlers: mariners, and fishermen from the port of Saint-Malo.

Pontoise Cathedral is dedicated to Saint Malo. Lesmahagow Priory in South Lanarkshire is also dedicated to him in the Latin form of his name, Machutus. He is the patron saint of the churches of St. Maughans and Llanfaenor in Monmouthshire and Llanfechell in Anglesey.

The place-name Saint-Maclou also refers to him.

See also 
Blessed Julian Maunoir, "Apostle of Brittany"

Notes

References

Sources

520 births
621 deaths
Medieval Breton saints
Saint-Malo
7th-century Christian saints
Voyagers in Celtic mythology
Medieval Welsh saints
Year of birth unknown
6th-century Breton people
7th-century Breton people